Alex Tanney (born November 11, 1987) is an American football coach and former quarterback who is the quarterbacks coach for the Philadelphia Eagles of the National Football League (NFL). He played college football at Monmouth College and signed as an undrafted free agent with the Kansas City Chiefs in 2012. Tanney played in the NFL for nine seasons with the Chiefs, Dallas Cowboys, Cleveland Browns, Tampa Bay Buccaneers, Tennessee Titans, Buffalo Bills, Indianapolis Colts and New York Giants before retiring in 2020.

Tanney began his coaching in 2021 as an offensive quality control coach with the Eagles under head coach Nick Sirianni.

Early life
Tanney was a three-sport high school standout athlete at Lexington High School in Lexington, Illinois, where he finished as the school's all-time leading point scorer. He was a two-time first-team Illinois All-State quarterback. He led his team to the IHSA state semi-finals his senior year. He was also named an All-State basketball player. Tanney also placed at the IHSA State Track and Field Finals his junior and senior years.

Playing career

College
Tanney broke nearly every school record during his time at Monmouth College. His career began in 2007 when he threw for 2,678 yards and 24 touchdowns. In his sophomore season in 2008, Tanney broke the Monmouth record of single season touchdown passes with 50. For his junior campaign, Tanney threw for 3,856 yards and 44 touchdowns which led him to be named the Melberger Award winner as NCAA D-III's top player. After redshirting the 2010 season with an injury, he came back in 2011 and threw for a career-high 3,867 yards along with 38 touchdowns. He won three Midwest Conference Offensive Player of the Year Awards along with numerous All-American Awards.

In July 2011, History Channel's Stan Lee's Superhumans filmed an episode featuring Tanney.

On October 29, 2011, in a game against Carroll University, Tanney set the NCAA record for all-time all-division career touchdown passes with 150, surpassing Jimmy Terwilliger's record of 148. Tanney finished his collegiate career with 157 touchdown passes and has the second most passing yards in NCAA D-III history with 14,249.

National Football League

Kansas City Chiefs
Tanney signed a contract with the Kansas City Chiefs as an undrafted free agent on June 5, 2012. He was placed on injured reserve with a finger injury on September 1, 2012.

Dallas Cowboys
On July 21, 2013, the Cowboys signed Tanney to their roster. On August 4, 2013, Tanney played the entire second half of the Hall of Fame Game in Canton, Ohio. In five 2013 preseason games (including the August 29 finale against the Houston Texans, in which he played all but one series) Tanney completed 40 of 73 passes for 423 yards and a touchdown, with two interceptions. Tanney was released by the Cowboys on August 30, 2013. After clearing waivers, Tanney was assigned to the Cowboys' eight-player practice squad.

Cleveland Browns
On November 26, 2013, the Cleveland Browns signed Tanney off the Cowboys' practice squad. On May 12, 2014, the Browns released Tanney.

Tampa Bay Buccaneers
Tanney was signed by the Tampa Bay Buccaneers on May 20, 2014. The Buccaneers released Tanney on August 24, 2014.

Tennessee Titans
Tanney was signed to the practice squad of the Tennessee Titans on December 16, 2014. He signed a futures contract with the Titans on December 29, 2014. The Titans released Tanney on September 5, 2015.

Buffalo Bills
Tanney was signed to the practice squad of the Buffalo Bills on September 7, 2015. Tanney was dropped from the practice squad a day later, after the team re-signed Matt Cassel.

Indianapolis Colts
Tanney signed to the practice squad of the Indianapolis Colts on September 29, 2015. He was released on October 20, 2015. Tanney re-signed to the practice squad on November 10, 2015.

Tennessee Titans (second stint)
On December 21, 2015, Tanney was signed off the Colts practice squad by the Tennessee Titans. He made his NFL regular-season debut on January 3, 2016 against the Indianapolis Colts, relieving the injured Zach Mettenberger in the third quarter and going 10-for-14 for 99 yards and throwing his first career touchdown pass, to Dorial Green-Beckham. On September 13, 2016, he was waived by the Titans and was re-signed to their practice squad the next day. On December 27, 2016, he was promoted to the active roster.

On September 2, 2017, Tanney was placed on injured reserve. On April 30, 2018, Tanney was released by the Titans.

New York Giants
On May 2, 2018, Tanney signed with the New York Giants. Tanney was named on the Giants’ 53-man roster on September 1, 2018 as the primary backup to Eli Manning.

On March 4, 2019, Tanney signed a two-year contract extension with the Giants. He was released on October 10, 2019, but re-signed the next day.

Tanney was placed on the active/non-football illness list by the Giants at the start of training camp on July 28, 2020, and moved back to the active roster six days later. On September 5, 2020, Tanney was released from the Giants. On December 5, 2020, Tanney was signed to the Giants practice squad. He signed a reserve/future contract on January 4, 2021. He announced his retirement on February 9, 2021.

Career statistics

Coaching career

Philadelphia Eagles
In 2021, Tanney was hired by the Philadelphia Eagles as an offensive quality control coach under head coach Nick Sirianni. In 2022, Tanney was promoted to assistant quarterbacks coach and offensive assistant coach.

On February 28, 2023, Tanney was promoted to quarterbacks coach, replacing Brian Johnson, who was promoted to offensive coordinator.

References

External links
Philadelphia Eagles profile

1987 births
Living people
American football quarterbacks
Cleveland Browns players
Coaches of American football from Illinois
Dallas Cowboys players
Kansas City Chiefs players
Indianapolis Colts players
Monmouth College alumni
Monmouth Fighting Scots football players
New York Giants players
People from Lexington, Illinois
Philadelphia Eagles coaches
Players of American football from Illinois
Tampa Bay Buccaneers players
Tennessee Titans players